Oecanthus nigricornis is a "common tree cricket" in the subfamily Oecanthinae ("tree crickets"). A common name for O. nigricornis is black-horned tree cricket.
It is found in North America.

Courtship feeding
Bell 1979 finds courtship feeding goes into increased fecundity, however Arnold and Duvall 1994 finds quantity to not be the selection criterion: Female choice has evolved to prefer mates who give the highest value nuptial gift, disregarding quantity. Variation in quality between gifts also plays a role.

References

Further reading
 
  .

External links
NCBI Taxonomy Browser, Oecanthus nigricornis

nigricornis
Orthoptera of North America
Insects described in 1869
Taxa named by Francis Walker (entomologist)